The third LG Cup is an exhibition association football tournament that took place in Morocco. This edition of LG cup involved Olympic teams.

Participants

The participants were:
 Morocco Olympic

Results

Semifinals

Third place match

Final

References

International association football competitions hosted by Morocco
1999 in association football
1999 in Moroccan sport
1999 in African football
Sport in Casablanca